Angelitos negros (English title:Black Angels) is a Mexican telenovela produced by Valentín Pimstein for Teleprogramas Acapulco, SA in 1970.

Cast 
 Silvia Derbez as Nana Mercé
 Alicia Rodríguez as Ana Luisa de la Fuente
 Manuel López Ochoa as Juan Carlos Flores
 Titina Romay as Isabel
 Antonio Raxel as Don Luis de la Fuente
 Josefina Escobedo as Carlota / Elisa
 Lilia Aragón as Jova
 Juanita Hernández Mejía as Belén Flores de la Fuente
 Malú Reyes as Malú
 Armando Velasco as Padre Padilla
 Miguel Macía as Sr. Sánchez
 Fernando Mendoza as Lic. Peláez
 Raúl "Chato" Padilla as Don Romualdo
 Rafael del Río as Toño
 Norma Jiménez Pons as María Flora
 Gerardo del Castillo as Don Laureano

References

External links 

Mexican telenovelas
1970 telenovelas
Spanish-language telenovelas
Televisa telenovelas
1970 Mexican television series debuts
1970 Mexican television series endings